In enzymology, a 3α,7α-dihydroxy-5β-cholestanate—CoA ligase is an enzyme that catalyzes the chemical reaction

ATP + (25R)-3alpha,7alpha-dihydroxy-5beta-cholestan-26-oate + CoA  AMP + diphosphate + (25R)-3alpha,7alpha-dihydroxy-5beta-cholestanoyl-CoA

The 3 substrates of this enzyme are ATP, (25R)-3alpha,7alpha-dihydroxy-5beta-cholestan-26-oate, and CoA, whereas its 3 products are AMP, diphosphate, and (25R)-3alpha,7alpha-dihydroxy-5beta-cholestanoyl-CoA.

This enzyme belongs to the family of ligases, specifically those forming carbon-sulfur bonds as acid-thiol ligases.  The systematic name of this enzyme class is (25R)-3alpha,7alpha-dihydroxy-5beta-cholestan-26-oate:CoA ligase (AMP-forming). Other names in common use include 3alpha,7alpha-dihydroxy-5beta-cholestanoyl coenzyme A synthetase, DHCA-CoA ligase, and 3alpha,7alpha-dihydroxy-5beta-cholestanate:CoA ligase (AMP-forming).  This enzyme participates in bile acid biosynthesis.

References 

 

EC 6.2.1
Enzymes of unknown structure